Allensville is an unincorporated community in Person County, North Carolina. As of 2020, the township has a population of 2,767.

Geography
Allensville has an elevation of 545 feet. It is part of the Eastern Standard Time Zone. The township lies 5.8 miles east of Roxboro.

Demographics
As of 2022, the township holds a racial diversity of 67% White and 32% African American. There is an approximate 0% in all other race categories. The township has a 13.7% poverty rate and an unemployment rate of 1.2%. 36% of residents have a high school diploma or equivalent. 36% of residents have some college experience or an associate degree and 13% have a bachelor's degree. Only 2% have a master's degree. 23% of residents living in Allensville are between the ages of 55 and 64. 18% are 65 and older and 16% are between 35 and 44 years of age. 12% of residents are between the ages of 10 and 17 years and 10% are 10 years of age. Minority age groups include 18 to 24-year-olds (7%) and 25 to 34-year-olds (4%). 82% of residents are home owners while the remaining 18% pay rent. The average cost of renting a place is $731. The average household income is $65,726.

Education
Allensville is served by the Person County School system. Learning sites include:
Early Intervention & Family Services
Earl Bradsher Preschool
Person County Schools Virtual Academy
Stories Creek Elementary School
Woodland Elementary School
Helena Elementary School
Oak Lane Elementary School
North Elementary School 
North End Elementary School
South Elementary School
Northern Middle School
Southern Middle School
Person Early College for Innovation & Leadership
Person High School
Person County Learning Academy

The township is also served by the Granville County School district including the Phoenix Academy that educates students from kindergarten to high school.

Places of interest
Allensville United Methodist Church

External links
Allensville, NC Niche.com Profile
North Carolina Hometown Locator.com
Census Reporter.org

References

Census-designated places in North Carolina
Census-designated places in Durham County, North Carolina
Census-designated places in Person County, North Carolina